Crook as Rookwood is a 2005 Ned Kelly Award-winning novel by the Australian author Chris Nyst.

Awards

Ned Kelly Awards for Crime Writing, Best Novel, 2006: joint winner

Notes

Dedication: "To my beautiful sons and my darling daughters".
Peter Rozovsky, of the "Detectives Beyond Borders" weblog, listed this as one of his favorite crime novels of 2007.

Reviews

"The Age" 
"Books and Musings From DownUnder" 
"Crime Down Under"

References

Australian crime novels
2005 Australian novels
Ned Kelly Award-winning works
HarperCollins books